Best II is the fourth compilation album by Japanese singer Akina Nakamori.

Background
The compilation album contains all the singles released between 1986 and 1988: from the single Nonfiction Ecstasy until latest single released in 1988 I Missed The Shock during that time. The singles Nonfiction Ecstasy, Nanpasen, Blonde, Al-Mauj, Tattoo and I Missed The Shock were recorded in the album for first time. A three different album jackets were published in the CD, Vinyl and Cassette Tape.

Promotion

Singles
Nonfiction Ecstasy is the Nakamori's first and only compact cassette single released on 10 November 1986. The single was released with the limited number of copies. The single debuted at number 1 on Oricon Single Weekly Chart.

Blonde is the eighteenth single released on 3 June 1987. Later, the English version of the single with English lyrics The Look That Kills was recorded in the studio album Cross My Palm. The single debuted at number 1 on Oricon Single Weekly Chart and became the 7th best sold single in 1985. In the Best Ten ranking, it debuted on number 1 and stayed at number 15 in the yearly chart. It has received cable music award in the 20th Japan Cable Awards.

Nanpasen is the nineteenth single released on 30 September 1987. The original song was performed and written by Tokiko Kato in 1984. Tokiko herself sent Nakamori demo tape and asked her to perform this single. After watching celebration of Nakamori's 22nd birthday, Tokiko assumed to herself that the song is suitable for Nakamori to perform. The single debuted at number 1 on Oricon Single Weekly Chart and became the 6th best sold single in 1987 and 81st best sold single in 1988. In the Best Ten ranking, it debuted on number 1 and stayed at number 7 in the 1987 yearly chart and at number 79 in the 1988 yearly chart.

It has received multiple music awards: Gold Award from Pop Category in 17th Ginza Music Festival, Special Award in the 13th National Kayo Music Festival, Best Broadcast Music Award and Broadcast Music Special Federation Award in the 18th Japan Music Awards, Most Requested Singer Award in the 20th Japan Cable Awards, Excellent Star Award and Most Requested Award in the 20th National Cable Broadcasting Award, Best Singing Award in the 16th FNS Music Festival, Gold award and Special public Award in the 29th Japan Record Awards, The Best Single of the Year Award in the 2nd Japan Gold Disc Award.

Al-Mauj is the twentieth single released on 27 January 1988. It's Nakamori's third single with the motive of the oriental sound, which is since Gypsy Queen and Sand Beige. The title comes from the Arabian language and it means love. The single debuted at number 1 on Oricon Single Weekly Chart and became the 14th best sold single in 1988. In the Best Ten ranking, it debuted on number 1 and stayed at number 18 in the yearly chart.

Tattoo is the twenty-first single released on 18 May 1988. The music producer is Anri Sekine from the Eurox, who previously worked on the Nakamori's first self-produce album Fushigi. Nakamori herself wanted to avoid a mini skirt and doesn't like them to wear, however she stated that it suits the atmosphere of this song. In the media it was used as a commercial song to the Orient Watch. The single debuted at number 1 on Oricon Single Weekly Chart and became the 13th best sold single in 1988. In the Best Ten ranking, it debuted on number 1 and stayed at number 9 in the yearly chart.

It has received three music awards: Pops Megalopolis Award and Pops Grand Prix Award in the 7th Megapolis Music Festival, Yomiuri TV Grand Prize in the 21st National Cable Broadcasting Award and Gold Award in the 30th 30th Japan Record Awards.

"Missed The Shock" is the twenty-second single released on 1 November 1988. The writer Qumico Fucci worked with Nakamori in the studio album Femme Fatale. Originally, I Missed the Shock was originally to be released B-side song of the early promoted single, Bilitis. The single debuted at number 3 on Oricon Single Weekly Chart and became the 57th best sold single in 1988 and the 53rd best sold single in 1989. In the Best Ten ranking, it debuted on number 3 and stayed at number 39 in the yearly chart.

It has received three music awards: Cable Music Award in the 21st Japan Cable Awards, double awards Best Singing Award and Best Kayo Music Award in the 17th FNS Music Festival and Excellent Star award in the 21st National Cable Broadcasting Award.

Charting performance
It went to No.2 on the Japanese album chart on the week of release and remained at No.1 for two weeks. The album charted for 32 weeks. The album remained at number 4 on the Oricon Album Yearly Charts in 1989.

Track list

References

1988 compilation albums
Akina Nakamori compilation albums
Warner Music Japan compilation albums
Japanese-language compilation albums